The Limbo Line is a 1963 spy thriller novel by the British writer Victor Canning. A former British secret service agent Richard Manston is called out of retirement to tackle a Soviet spy network kidnapping recent defectors to be taken back to Moscow.

The book acts as a prequel to the four Rex Carver novels in that it introduces the Government agency that Carver is later unwillingly drawn into. Manston also appears as a character in some of the Rex Carver books.

Film adaptation
In 1968 the novel was turned into a film of the same title directed by Samuel Gallu and starring Craig Stevens and Kate O'Mara. The story was reissued by Pan Books as a tie-in with the film release.

References

Bibliography
 Burton, Alan. Looking-Glass Wars: Spies on British Screens since 1960. Vernon Press, 2018.
 Goble, Alan. The Complete Index to Literary Sources in Film. Walter de Gruyter, 1999.

1963 British novels
British spy novels
British thriller novels
Novels set in London
British novels adapted into films
Novels by Victor Canning
Heinemann (publisher) books